Bishop Bernard William Allen Collier, O.S.B. (1802 – 21 November 1890) was an English-born Roman Catholic prelate. He was the second Vicar Apostolic and the first Diocesan Bishop of the Roman Catholic Diocese of Port-Louis from 14 February 1840 until his resignation on 6 September 1863.

Life 
Born in Rokery Close, North Yorkshire, United Kingdom in 1802. After the school education, he subsequently joined the Benedictine Douai Abbey, where he made a profession and was ordained as a priest in 1826, after completed philosophical and theological studies. He served as a procurator general of the English Benedictines to the Holy See in Rome, until his election as bishop.

He was appointed by the Holy See as the second Vicar Apostolic of the Vicariate Apostolic of Mauritius and the Titular Bishop of Milevum on 14 February 1840. He was consecrated to the Episcopate on 3 May 1840. The principal consecrator was Cardinal Giacomo Filippo Fransoni.

After his returning from the missionary work in Mauritius, Bishop Collier was actively included in the service for the Catholics in Herefordshire and Wales. For example, he was a co-founder of the parish in Aberystwyth in 1867.

He died in Herefordshire on 21 November 1890 and was buried at the Abbots' Graveyard in the Benedictine Priory in Belmont.

References 

1802 births
1890 deaths
People from Richmondshire (district)
19th-century Roman Catholic bishops in Mauritius
English Benedictines
Benedictine bishops
English Roman Catholic missionaries
Roman Catholic bishops of Port-Louis
Burials at Belmont Abbey, Herefordshire